Médina Yoro Foulah Department is one of the 45 departments of Senegal, located in the Kolda Region. It was created in 2008.

It contains two communes: Médina Yoro Foulah and Pata

The rural districts (Communautés rurales) comprise:
Arrondissement of Fafacourou:
 Badion
 Fafacourou
Arrondissement of Ndorna:
 Bourouco
 Bignarabé
 Ndorna
 Koulinto
Arrondissement of Niaming:
 Niaming
 Dinguiraye (Kolda)
 Kéréwane

Historic sites
 Fortification of Moussa Molo Baldé at Ndorna
 Tomb of Coumba Oudé at Soulabaly
 Hamdallahi historic site

References

Departments of Senegal
Kolda Region